Newtownabbey is a large settlement north of Belfast city centre in County Antrim, Northern Ireland. It is separated from the rest of the city by Cavehill and Fortwilliam golf course. It surrounds Carnmoney Hill, and was formed from the merging of several small villages including Whiteabbey, Glengormley and Carnmoney. At the 2011 Census, Metropolitan Newtownabbey Settlement had a population of 65,646, making it the third largest settlement in Northern Ireland. It is part of Antrim and Newtownabbey Borough Council.

History

Founding
Newtownabbey Urban District was founded on 1 April 1958 to cover seven villages north of Belfast: Carnmoney, Glengormley, Jordanstown, Monkstown, Whiteabbey, Whitehouse and Whitewell. Before this, the area fell under the jurisdiction of Belfast Rural District.

Newtownabbey Urban District Council was succeeded by Newtownabbey District Council (1973–1977), Newtownabbey Borough Council (1977–2015), and Antrim and Newtownabbey District Council (2015 onwards).

The Troubles

During The Troubles, there were a number of incidents in Newtownabbey, including several gun attacks involving the UFF and UVF.

Geography

Newtownabbey is a large dispersed urban area north of Belfast, surrounding Carnmoney Hill. To its east is Belfast Lough, and to its south and west is Cavehill. There are two wooded river glens running through it: the Three Mile Water and the Glas-na-Bradan.

Townlands
Below is a list of townlands that are within Newtownabbey's urban area, alongside their likely etymologies.

Ballybought*
Ballyduff (from Baile Mhic Giolla Dhuibh, "MacElduff's townland")*
Ballygolan (from Baile an Ghabhláin, "townland of the fork")*
Ballyhenry (from Baile Éinrí, "Henry's townland")*
Ballyvesey (possibly from Baile an Mheasa, "townland of the mast)*
Ballywonard (from Baile an Mhuine Aird, "townland of the high thicket")*
Carnmoney
Collinward (possibly from Baile Gorán Bhaird, "townland of the bard's grove")*
Croghfern (possibly from Currach Fearnaí, "marsh of the place of alders")*
Drumnadrough (from Droim na gCruach, "the ridge of the stacks")*, site of Merville Garden Village
Dunanney (from Dún Áine, "Áine's fort")*
Glengormley
Jordanstown
Mallusk
Monkstown
Whiteabbey
Whitehouse (named after a 16th-century fortified house built by an English adventurer; formerly Ballyrintollard)

Other districts include:
Mossley (named after Mossley in England; in Ballyhenry townland)
Rathcoole
Whitewell (named after a former spring; in Ballygolan townland)

* citation for derivations

Demography
On census day (27 March 2011) there were 65,646 people living in Newtownabbey. Of these:
20.26% were aged under 16 years and 15.51% were aged 60 and over
48.02% of the population were male and 51.98% were female
62.21% were from a Protestant or other Christian backgrounds, and 27.69% were from a Catholic background
6.40% had some knowledge of the Irish language and 6.98% had some knowledge of Ulster-Scots.

Education
Higher-level education
 University of Ulster at Jordanstown (UUJ)
 Northern Regional College (NRC)

Secondary-level education
 Belfast High School
 Edmund Rice College
 Glengormley High School
 Abbey Community College

Primary-level education
 Jordanstown Schools for the Deaf and Blind
 Whitehouse Primary School
 Ashgrove Primary School
 Carnmoney Primary School

Sport
There are several association football clubs in Newtownabbey, including several amateur clubs which field teams in the Northern Amateur Football League: 18th Newtownabbey Old Boys F.C., Mossley F.C., Nortel F.C., Rathfern Rangers F.C., and Ulster University at Jordanstown F.C. Rathcoole F.C. plays in the Ballymena & Provincial Football League. As of 2020, Belfast Deaf United Football Club played in the Down Area Winter Football League.

Local Gaelic games clubs include St Enda's GAC (based near Glengormley) and Greencastle Wolfe Tones GAC (based at Greencastle). Both participate in competitions organised by the Antrim County Board.

Hockey teams based in Newtownabbey include East Antrim Hockey Club, Mossley Hockey Club, and Owls Hockey Club. There are also a number of rugby clubs, an amateur boxing club (Glengormley Amateur Boxing Club), and several cricket teams. These include the Academy and Cliftonville Cricket Clubs (the latter participating in the NCU Senior League).

Outdoor bowling clubs in Newtownabbey include Mossley Bowling Club, Glengormley Bowling Club, Nortel Bowling Club and Ulster Transport Bowling Club.

Transport

Rail
Northern Ireland Railways runs trains serving three railway stations: Mossley West railway station on the Belfast–Derry railway line and Jordanstown railway station and Whiteabbey railway station on the Belfast–Larne railway line.

Road
Newtownabbey is linked to the M2 motorway (which passes through it) and the M5 motorway (which begins at its southeastern edge).

Bus services are provided by Translink’s Belfast bus service, Metro.

Notable people 

 Stephen Boyd (4 July 1931 - 2 June 1977),  Golden Globe-winning actor, was born in Glengormley.
 Bobby Sands (9 March 1954 - 5 May 1981), Provisional Irish Republican Army member and hunger striker, grew up in Newtownabbey.
 James Brown (born 1968), Elvis impersonator, lives in Newtownabbey.
 Ronan Bennett (born 14 January 1956), novelist and screenwriter, grew up in Newtownabbey.
 Dean McCullough (born July 1992), British radio personality, lives in Newtownabbey.
 Leah McFall (born 1 July 1986), singer-songwriter, was born in Newtownabbey.

Twin towns
Newtownabbey is twinned with:
 Rybnik, Poland (since 18 October 2003)
 Dorsten, Germany

Newtownabbey has one sister city, as designated by Sister Cities International:
  Gilbert, Arizona , United States

See also
 List of localities in Northern Ireland by population

References

External links

Antrim & Newtonabbey Borough Council official website
Culture Northern Ireland - Newtownabbey (archived)

 
Towns in County Antrim